In the Inuit religion of the Yup'ik the Negafook (or Negagfok) represents "the North Wind" or "the spirit that likes cold and stormy weather."

A mask representing Negafok is held by the Metropolitan Museum of Art in New York City. It was created for use in ceremonies, along with masks that represented the other winds, and commemorates a "weather event" in the early 20th century.

References 

Inuit gods
Sky and weather gods
Wind deities